The Congo white-toothed shrew (Crocidura congobelgica) is a species of mammal in the family Soricidae. It is found in the Democratic Republic of the Congo and Uganda. Its natural habitat is subtropical or tropical moist lowland forests.

References

Crocidura
Mammals described in 1916
Taxonomy articles created by Polbot